Petko Sirakov (16 February 1929 – 8 April 1996) was a Bulgarian wrestler who competed in the 1956 Summer Olympics. He was the father of the former Bulgarian footballer Nasko Sirakov.

References

1929 births
1996 deaths
Olympic wrestlers of Bulgaria
Wrestlers at the 1956 Summer Olympics
Bulgarian male sport wrestlers
Olympic silver medalists for Bulgaria
Olympic medalists in wrestling
People from Varna Province
Medalists at the 1956 Summer Olympics
20th-century Bulgarian people